The United Kingdom participated in the Eurovision Song Contest 2006 with the song "Teenage Life" written by Daz Sampson and John Matthews. The song was performed by Daz Sampson. The British entry for the 2006 contest in Athens, Greece was selected via the national final Eurovision: Making Your Mind Up 2006, organised by the British broadcaster BBC. Six acts competed in the national final and the winner was selected entirely through a public vote.

As a member of the "Big Four", the United Kingdom automatically qualified to compete in the final of the Eurovision Song Contest. Performing in position 15, the United Kingdom placed 19th out of the 24 participating countries with 25 points.

Background

Prior to the 2006 contest, the United Kingdom has participated in the Eurovision Song Contest forty-eight times. Thus far, the United Kingdom has won the contest five times: in 1967 with the song "Puppet on a String" performed by Sandie Shaw, in 1969 with the song "Boom Bang-a-Bang" performed by Lulu, in 1976 with the song "Save Your Kisses for Me" performed by Brotherhood of Man, in 1981 with the song "Making Your Mind Up" performed by Bucks Fizz and in 1997 with the song "Love Shine a Light" performed by Katrina and the Waves. To this point, the nation is noted for having finished as the runner-up in a record fifteen contests. Up to and including 1998, the UK had only twice finished outside the top 10, in 1978 and 1987. Since 1999, the year in which the rule was abandoned that songs must be performed in one of the official languages of the country participating, the UK has had less success, thus far only finishing within the top ten once: in 2002 with the song "Come Back" performed by Jessica Garlick. For the 2005 contest, the United Kingdom finished in twenty-second place out of twenty-four competing entries with the song "Touch My Fire" performed by Javine.

The British national broadcaster, BBC, broadcasts the event within the United Kingdom and organises the selection process for the nation's entry. BBC announced that the United Kingdom would participate in the Eurovision Song Contest 2006 on 29 November 2005. BBC has traditionally organised a national final featuring a competition among several artists and songs to choose the British entry for Eurovision. For their 2006 entry, the broadcaster announced that a national final involving a public vote would be held to select United Kingdom's entry.

Before Eurovision

Eurovision: Making Your Mind Up 2006 

Eurovision: Making Your Mind Up 2006 was the national final developed by the BBC in order to select the British entry for the Eurovision Song Contest 2006. Six acts competed in a televised show on 4 March 2006 held at the BBC Television Centre in London and hosted by Terry Wogan and Natasha Kaplinsky. The winner was selected entirely through a public vote. The show was broadcast on BBC One. The first part of the national final was watched by 2.8 million viewers in the United Kingdom, while the second part was watched by 6.1 million viewers in the United Kingdom.

Competing entries 
The BBC collaborated with radio director and Fame Academy judge, Richard Park, to select six finalists to compete in the national final. Entries were provided to Park and the BBC by music industry experts including writers and producers, and an additional entry was provided by BBC Radio 2 which ran the competition Sold on Song. On 29 November 2005, an open submission was announced for interested songwriters to submit their songs for the competition until 31 December 2005. The 800 received submissions were reviewed and a six-member professional panel selected the winning song, "I Wanna Man", from a ten-song shortlist. The panel consisted of Mike Batt (singer-songwriter and producer), Simon Webbe (singer-songwriter, rapper, actor and music manager), Hugh Goldsmith (former music director of RCA Records and founder of Innocent Records), Stuart Maconie (television and radio presenter, journalist and music critic), Colin Martin (music editor at BBC Radio 2) and Mark Hagen (producer at BBC Radio 2). The six competing songs for the national final were announced on 16 February 2006.

Final 
Six acts competed in the televised final on 4 March 2006. In addition to their performances, the guest performer was previous Eurovision Song Contest winner Helena Paparizou, who won the contest for Greece in 2005 with the song "My Number One".

A panel of experts provided feedback regarding the songs during the show. The panel consisted of Kelly Osbourne (singer, actress, model and television personality), Jonathan Ross (television and radio presenter, actor, comedian and producer), Fearne Cotton (television and radio presenter) and Bruno Tonioli (choreographer, dancer and television personality). A public vote consisting of regional televoting, SMS voting and online voting selected the winner, "Teenage Life" performed by Daz Sampson. The results of each televoting region and the online vote awarded 2, 4, 6, 8 and 12 points to their top five songs, while the SMS vote was awarded based on the percentage of votes each song achieved. For example, if a song gained 10% of the SMS vote, then that entry would be awarded 10 points.

12 points

Controversy 
Prior to the national final, Eurovision news website Oikotimes claimed that the songs "Teenage Life" and "It's a Beautiful Thing" (both of which eventually placed in the top two) would be disqualified from the competition as they had been commercially released before 1 October 2005. The BBC later responded by stating that both songs comply with the European Broadcasting Union (EBU) rules as the original version of "Teenage Life" was released under Daz Sampson's stage name Spacekats only as a white label record, while "It's a Beautiful Thing" was never commercially released as it wasn't available legally on the Internet.

At Eurovision
According to Eurovision rules, all nations with the exceptions of the host country, the "Big Four" (France, Germany, Spain and the United Kingdom) and the ten highest placed finishers in the 2005 contest are required to qualify from the semi-final in order to compete for the final; the top ten countries from the semi-final progress to the final. As a member of the "Big Four", the United Kingdom automatically qualified to compete in the final on 20 May 2006. In addition to their participation in the final, the United Kingdom is also required to broadcast and vote in the semi-final on 18 May 2006.

In the United Kingdom, the semi-final was broadcast on BBC Three with commentary by Paddy O'Connell, while the final was televised on BBC One with commentary by Terry Wogan and broadcast on BBC Radio 2 with commentary by Ken Bruce. The British spokesperson, who announced the British votes during the final, was Fearne Cotton.

Final 
Daz Sampson took part in technical rehearsals on 7 and 8 May, followed by dress rehearsals on 11 and 12 May. During the running order draw for the semi-final and final on 21 March 2006, the United Kingdom was placed to perform in position 15 in the final, following the entry from Lithuania and before the entry from Greece.

The British performance featured Daz Sampson, joined by five dancers/backing vocalists dressed in school uniform, performing on a multicoloured stage which featured props, including desks which papers were thrown out from, and a blackboard with Sampson's name written on, with the background displaying the words "class", "school", "history" and "book". The performance during the national final featured dancers miming the voices of a choir of young girls, however for Eurovision the voices were sung live by the dancers in order to avoid the violation of EBU rules. The supporting performers that joined Daz Sampson for the performance were Ashlee, Emily Reed, Gabriella, Holly and Leeanne Simister. The United Kingdom placed nineteenth in the final, scoring 25 points.

Voting 
Below is a breakdown of points awarded to the United Kingdom and awarded by the United Kingdom in the semi-final and grand final of the contest. The nation awarded its 12 points to Finland in the semi-final and the final of the contest.

Points awarded to the United Kingdom

Points awarded by the United Kingdom

References

External links
 Making Your Mind Up BBC Radio 2 website

2006
Countries in the Eurovision Song Contest 2006
Eurovision
Eurovision